This is a list of primary and secondary schools in the Asian country of Saudi Arabia.  Tertiary schools are presented on the separate list of universities and colleges in Saudi Arabia.

Al-Qassim Region 
 Buraydah
 Manarat Al-Qassim School
 Pakistan International School Buraydah

'Asir Region 
 Abha
 Ibdaa Assir International School (previously Philippine International School in Assir)

Eastern Province 
 Dammam
 Al Hammad Academy
 Al Jazeera International School Dammam
 Al-Majd International School
 Bangladesh International School, Dammam
 International Indian School, Dammam
 ISG Dammam
 Dhahran
 Dhahran School
American School Dhahran 
 Jubail
 International Indian School, Al-Jubail
 Khobar
 British International School Al Khobar
 Jubail Academy International School
 International Philippine School in Al Khobar
 Pakistan International School, Al-Khobar
International Programs School (Qurtoba, Al Khobar)

Mecca Region 
 Jeddah
 Al-Afaq International School
 Al Barakah Modern International School
 Al Dura (Gems) International School
 Al Mawarid International School
 Al Rowad International School
 Al-Thager Model School
 Al Wadi International School
 Al-Waha International School
 Al Wurood International School
 Alkon International School
 American International School of Jeddah
 Bangladesh International School Jeddah
 Beladi International School Jeddah
 British International School of Jeddah
 Dar Jana International School - Separate boys' and girls' sections
 DPS Jeddah Al-Falah International School
 Edu World International Schools
 German International School Jeddah
 International Indian School Jeddah
 International Philippine School in Jeddah
 International School Jeddah 
 Jeddah Japanese School
 Jeddah Knowledge International School
 Jeddah Prep And Grammar School
  (KISJ)
 It was established on 18 September 1976. On 2 June of that year the Middle East Economic Cooperation Working Committee decided to establish the school, with a preparation committee formed on 5 August.
 Manarat Jeddah International School
 Nobles International School
 Pakistan International School Jeddah
 Pakistan International School Jeddah - English Section) (PISJES) 
 Pearl of the Orient International School
 Philippine Sunrise International School
 Scuola Italiana di Gedda (Italian International School Jeddah)
 Sri Lankan International School Jeddah
 Talal International School
 Thamer International School
 The City School International
 Zahrat Al-Sahraa International School
 Ta'if
 Al Shorouq International School
 Pakistan International School

Medina Region
 Yanbu
 Radhwa International School (INDIAN & AMERICAN section) Royal Commission Yanbu

Riyadh Region 
 Riyadh
 International Schools
 SEK International School Riyadh
 Yara International School
 Indian Schools
 Al Alia International Indian School
 Al Yasmin International School  
 alif International School riyadh(Aisr)
 International Indian School, Riyadh
 New Middle East International School
Delhi Public School, Riyadh
SEVA School
Dunes International School, Abu Dhabi
Radhwa international School
Al Manar International School
 Other international Schools
 Al Danah International School
 Al-Hekma International School
 Al-Rowad International School
 Al Taj International School
 Aldenham Prep Riyadh
 Bangladesh International School, English Section, Riyadh
 British International School, Riyadh
 Fawaq International School
 Future Generation Philippine International School 
 German International School Riyadh
 International Philippine School in Riyadh
 
 Millennium International School
 Multinational School Riyadh (MNS-R)
 New Middle East International School, Riyadh
 Nour Al-Maaref International School
 Pakistan International School, Riyadh
 Palm Crest International School
 Riyadh International School
 Riyadh Japanese School
 Saud International School
 Saudi Arabian Multinational School
 Second Philippine International School
 Sri Lankan International School Riyadh
 Swedish School Riyadh
 One World International School

Tabuk Region
 Tabuk
 International School of KSAFH-NWR Tabuk (formerly British International School of Tabuk)

See also

 Education in Saudi Arabia
 Lists of schools

References

Schools
Schools
Saudi Arabia
Saudi Arabia
Schools